Binho is a nickname. It may refer to:

Football
Binho (footballer, born 1975), born Fábio Eduardo Cribari, Brazilian defender
Binho (footballer, born 1977), born George Miranda dos Santos, Brazilian midfielder

Politics
Binho Marques (born 1962), Brazilian politician